Pterinoxylus is a genus of phasmids belonging to the family Phasmatidae.

The species of this genus are found in Central America.

Species:

Pterinoxylus crassus 
Pterinoxylus eucnemis 
Pterinoxylus perarmatus 
Pterinoxylus spinulosus

References

Phasmatidae
Phasmatodea of South America